Rikichi (written: 利吉 or 理喜智) is a masculine Japanese given name. Notable people with the name include:

, Japanese general
, Japanese sumo wrestler
, Japanese general

Japanese masculine given names